Barcella is a surname. Notable people with the surname include:

 Fabien Barcella (born 1983), French rugby union player
 Giuseppe Barcella (1926–1992), Italian philatelist
 Lawrence Barcella (1945–2010), assistant United States attorney for the District of Columbia
 Lidia Barcella (born 1997), Italian racewalker